Group B of the 2019 FIBA Basketball World Cup was the group stage of the 2019 FIBA Basketball World Cup for the , ,  and . Each team played each other once, for a total of three games per team, with all games played at Wuhan Gymnasium, Wuhan. After all of the games were played, the top two teams with the best records qualified for the Second round and the bottom two teams played in the Classification Round.

Teams

Standings

Games
All times are local (UTC+8).

Russia vs. Nigeria
This was the first game between Russia and Nigeria in the World Cup. The Russians won against Nigeria in the 2012 FIBA World Olympic Qualifying Tournament for Men, the last competitive game between the two teams.

Argentina vs. South Korea
This was the second game between Argentina and South Korea in the World Cup, with the Argentinians winning the first game in 1994. Argentina also won their last competitive game against South Korea in the 1996 Olympics.

Nigeria vs. Argentina
This was the third game between Nigeria and Argentina in the World Cup. Argentina have won both games, and also won its last competitive game against the Nigerians at the 2016 Olympics.

South Korea vs. Russia
This was the first game between South Korea and Russia in the World Cup. The Russians won against South Korea in the 2012 FIBA World Olympic Qualifying Tournament for Men, the last competitive game between the two teams.

South Korea vs. Nigeria
This was the first competitive game between South Korea and Nigeria.

Russia vs. Argentina
This was the fourth game between Russia and Argentina in the World Cup. The Russians won their last competitive game against Argentina, in the 2012 Olympics.

References

External links

2019 FIBA Basketball World Cup
2018–19 in Russian basketball
2018–19 in Argentine basketball